Alexei Buzu (born 19 December 1983) is a Moldovan economist, currently serving as the Minister of Labour and Social Protection in the Recean Cabinet.

References

1983 births
Living people
Moldovan economists
Government ministers of Moldova